Bohol's 3rd congressional district is one of the three congressional districts of the Philippines in the province of Bohol. It has been represented in the House of Representatives of the Philippines since 1916 and earlier in the Philippine Assembly from 1907 to 1916. The district consists of the southeastern municipalities of Alicia, Anda, Batuan, Bilar, Candijay, Carmen, Dimiao, Duero, Garcia Hernandez, Guindulman, Jagna, Lila, Loay, Loboc, Mabini, Pilar, Sevilla, Sierra Bullones and Valencia. It is currently represented in the 19th Congress by Alexie Tutor of the Nacionalista Party (NP).

Representation history

Election results

2022

2019

2016

≥u

2013

2010

See also
Legislative districts of Bohol

References

Congressional districts of the Philippines
Politics of Bohol
1907 establishments in the Philippines
Congressional districts of Central Visayas
Constituencies established in 1907